Golden Eagle Peak is a summit in Alberta, Canada.

Golden Eagle Peak was so named on account of golden eagles in the area.

See also 
 List of mountains in the Canadian Rockies

References

Mountains of Banff National Park
Three-thousanders of Alberta
Alberta's Rockies